Japan–Latin America relations are relations between Japan and the countries of Latin America. Relations span a period not later than the 19th century to the present.

Overview
In Latin America, Japan has a long history of diplomatic relations with countries like Peru and Brazil. There has been a large ethnic Japanese presence in Latin America since the late 1800s. In the past decade, two factors have driven a deepening of these trans-Pacific relationships: first, at the turn of the century, Japan shifted its foreign policy from its traditional emphasis on multilateral concepts to one emphasizing regionalism in order to shore up weakened competitiveness as compared to other international actors. Second, Latin American countries, especially South American ones, were experiencing high rates of economic growth and political stability, making the region more attractive to foreign investors.

Relations with particular Latin American countries

Culture
Japanese migrants brought Japanese culture to Latin America. They also introduced intensive farming systems and Asian crops and the concept of agricultural cooperatives.

References

Latin America
Latin America